Alexandra Ivanovna Strelkova (1833–1902) was a Russian stage actress.

Biography 
Born in to a family of serf actors in Nizhny Novgorod, she was the sister of the actress Khioniya Talanova (1822–1880), who was a star at the Maly Theatre (Moscow) 1860–80. She acted on the stage in Nizhny Novgorod already as a child. In 1852, she debuted as an adult actress in Kazan. She became one of the most famed tragediennes in 19th-century Russia, and it was said, that during the 1850s and 1860s, her name was known from Tver to Astrachan. She toured all over Russia: Kazan, Oryol, Saratov, Odessa and Kiev. She performed at the National Theater in Moscow (1872), in Saint Petersburg at the Alexandrinsky Theatre (1878–82), and at the Malý Theater in Moscow (1891–92).

Sources 
«Голос», 1878, Николaeв Н., Драматический театр в г. Киеве, Киев, 1898.

1833 births
1902 deaths
Actors from Nizhny Novgorod
19th-century actresses from the Russian Empire